Wisløff is a Norwegian surname that may refer to
Åse Wisløff Nilssen (born 1945), Norwegian politician 
Carl Fredrik Wisløff (1908–2004), Norwegian theologian and Christian preacher
Jens Wisløff (1921–1998), Norwegian businessman and politician 
Hans Edvard Wisløff (1902–1969), Norwegian theologian and writer, cousin of Carl
Ove Wisløff (born 1954), Norwegian swimmer 
Ulrik Wisløff (born 1968), Norwegian physiologist

Norwegian-language surnames